The history of the University of Michigan (Michigan) began with its establishment on August 26, 1817 as the Catholepistemiad or University of Michigania.

The Catholepistemiad (1817–1821) 

Shortly after the Territory of Michigan was formed in 1805, several of its leading citizens recognized the need for a structured education. As early as 1806, Father Gabriel Richard, who ran several schools around the town of Detroit, had requested land for a college from the governor and judges appointed by the President to administer the territory. Governor William Hull and Chief Justice Augustus B. Woodward passed an act in 1809 to establish public school districts, but this early attempt amounted to little. Woodward harbored a dream of classifying all human knowledge (which he termed encathol epistemia), and discussed the subject with his friend and mentor Thomas Jefferson at Monticello in 1814.

In 1817, Woodward drafted a territorial act establishing a "Catholepistemiad, or University of Michigania," organized into thirteen different professorships, or didaxiim, following the classification system he had published the year before in his A System of Universal Science. He invented names for these using a mix of Greek and Latin so they could be "engrafted, without variation, into every modern language": Anthropoglossica (Literature), Mathematica (Mathematics), Physiognostica (Natural History), Physiosophica (Natural Philosophy), Astronomia (Astronomy), Chymia (Chemistry), Iatrica (Medicine), Œconomica (Economical Sciences), Ethica (Ethics), Polemitactica (Military Science), Diëgetica (Historical Sciences), Ennœica (Intellectual Sciences), and Catholepistemia (Universal Science).

The Didactor (professor) of Catholepistemia was to be the President, and the Didactor of Ennœica the Vice-President. Under the act, the Didactors exercised control over not only the university itself, but education in the territory in general, with the authority to "establish colleges, academies, schools, libraries, museums, atheneums, botanical gardens, laboratories, and other useful literary and scientific institutions consonant to the laws of the United States and of Michigan, and provide for and appoint Directors, Visitors, Curators, Librarians, Instructors and Instructrixes among and throughout the various counties, cities, towns, townships, or other geographical divisions of Michigan."

The act was signed into law August 26, 1817, by Woodward, Judge John Griffin, and acting governor William Woodbridge (Governor Lewis Cass was absent on a trip with President Monroe). Father Richard was granted six didaxiim (and the Vice-Presidency), and the Rev. John Monteith, who had moved to Detroit a year earlier after graduating from Princeton Theological Seminary, was granted seven (and the Presidency).

When it came to funding the project, Woodward being a Freemason himself looked to Zion Lodge No. 1 of Detroit for financial support. On September 15, 1817 Zion Lodge met and subscribed the sum of $250 in aid of the university, payable in the sum of $50 per year. Of the total amount subscribed to start the university two-thirds came from Zion Lodge and its members.

The cornerstone of the university's first building, near the corner of Bates St. and Congress St. in Detroit, was laid on September 24, 1817, and within a year both a primary school and a classical academy were functioning within it.

Five days after the laying of the cornerstone, the Treaty of Fort Meigs was signed between the United States and various Native American tribes. No college had officially been created yet, so the next month Monteith and Richard decreed the creation of the "First College of Michigania" at Detroit. Despite this decree, no college was organized, and instruction remained limited to the existing primary school and academy.

The land granted to the college and the church was of two parts, one consisting of three sections near Macon, Michigan and one consisting of three sections to be selected later, with the college and church each having one-half interest in each section. These latter sections were not selected until 1821, and the university received legal title to them in 1824. In 1826, the university swapped its interest in the land at Macon for the church's interest in the others. Though evidence is scant, one historian believes that the land was later sold and the proceeds used in the running of the operation in Detroit.

The University of Michigan was sued in 1971 by descendants of the tribes who claimed that the land grant should have been held in trust, with the proceeds used to provide for their education. The court ruled in favor of the university, saying the lands were given as an outright gift (due in part to the tribes' affection for Father Richard), and the Michigan Court of Appeals upheld the ruling in 1981.

Name change (1821–1837) 

The unwieldy name of the Catholepistemiad and its constituent departments made it a target of ridicule. Governor Cass referred to it as the "Cathole-what's its name" and thought it a "pedantic and uncouth name," while Justice James V. Campbell said it was "neither Greek, Latin, nor English, [but merely] a piece of language gone mad." On April 30, 1821, Governor Cass and Judges Griffin and James Witherell passed a new act that changed the name of the institution to the University of Michigan and put control in the hands of a Board of Trustees consisting of 20 members plus the governor, with few other changes to its structure. Rev. Monteith, his office of President abolished, was appointed to the Board of Trustees, but left that summer to accept a professorship at Hamilton College. Father Richard was also appointed to the board and remained on it until his death in 1832.

The Trustees continued to oversee operation of the primary school and academy in Detroit and Grand Blanc, at one point reaching an enrollment of 200, but did not establish any additional schools, so the university continued to be one in name only. By 1827, neither school was operating, and the building in Detroit was leased to private teachers. Except as a legal entity, the University of Michigan had essentially ceased to exist.

19th century

Founding

In preparation for statehood, Michigan held a constitutional convention in 1835, although actual statehood was withheld by Congress until 1837, after the resolution of the so-called "Toledo War" with Ohio. Sarah Austin's English translation of Victor Cousin's Report on the State of Public Instruction in Prussia had just gained widespread attention, and thanks to its influence on two men, John Davis Pierce and Isaac Edwin Crary, the Michigan Constitution of 1835 was the first state constitution in the country to embrace the Prussian model of education, in which a complete system of primary schools, secondary schools, and a university are all administered by the state and supported with tax dollars. The constitution created the office of Superintendent of Public Instruction, and Governor Stevens T. Mason appointed Pierce to the post.

The Organic Act of March 18, 1837, created the University of Michigan, governed by a Board of Regents consisting of 12 members appointed by the Governor with the consent of the Senate, along with the Governor himself, the Lieutenant Governor, the Justices of the Michigan Supreme Court, and the Chancellor of the state. It also created the office of Chancellor of the University, who was to be appointed by the Regents and serve as ex officio President of the Board. In practice, however, the Regents never appointed a Chancellor, instead leaving administrative duties up to a rotating roster of professors, and the Governor chaired the board himself.

A group of businessmen called the Ann Arbor Land Company had set land aside in the village of Ann Arbor, trying to win a bid for a new state capital. When that did not happen, they offered it for sale to the state for use by the university. A second act passed two days after the Organic Act called for the University to be established in Ann Arbor, and directed the Regents to secure a site. The Board of Regents held its first meeting in Ann Arbor on June 5, 1837. At this meeting they chose 40 acres on the farm of Henry Rumsey as the new site for the university.

The first classes were held in 1841; six freshmen and a sophomore were taught by two professors. Eleven men graduated in the first commencement ceremony in 1845.

A new state constitution was adopted in 1850, with two significant changes related to the university. The office of Regent was changed from an appointed one to an elected one, and the office of President of the University of Michigan was created, with the Regents directed to select one. In 1852, they chose Henry Philip Tappan as the university's first president.

Early Expansion

Tappan modeled UM's curriculum on the broad range of subjects taught at German universities (the so-called "research model"), rather than the classical models (the so-called "recitation model"). The German, or Humboldtian model, was conceived by Wilhelm von Humboldt and based on Friedrich Schleiermacher’s liberal ideas pertaining to the importance of freedom, seminars, and laboratories in universities. To that end, Tappan enlarged the library, and supported the development and establishment of laboratories, an art gallery, and the Detroit Observatory. However, Tappan was dismissed in 1863 over conflicts with the Board of Regents concerning matters of policy and personality.

The Medical School was founded in 1848, and graduated 90 physicians in 1852. UM opened the first university-owned hospital in the U.S. in 1869. The first student newspaper, The Peninsular Phoenix and Gazetteer, was founded in 1857, which was followed by the biweekly University Chronicle in 1867 and The Michigan Daily in 1890.

By 1865 to 1866, the university's enrollment increased to 1,205 students, with many of the new enrollees veterans of the Civil War. In the July 1866 issue of The Atlantic Monthly, Harvard University Professor F.H. Hedge depicted UM as the model public institution of higher education for the growing nation. UM began to draw students from across the United States and abroad, and its student body included African Americans. More than 520 of the students enrolled in 1867 were studying at the Medical School. Also in 1867, maize and blue were voted class colors; the Board of Regents made them the official colors of the UM in 1912.

The university's first known African American student, Samuel Codes Watson, was admitted as a medical student in 1853; the first female student, Madelon Louisa Stockwell (lit. 1872) of Kalamazoo, Michigan, was admitted in 1870, and the first known African American woman admitted was Mary Henrietta Graham, in 1876 (lit. 1880). By 1882, UM's alumnae included the president of Wellesley College, Alice Elvira Freeman Palmer. The growing student body also led to unruliness. In 1872, Ann Arbor hosted 49 saloons, and the spectacle of student intoxication and public donnybrooks concerned school administrators and state politicians. Harper's Weekly published an article in July 1887 that noted the school's "broad and liberal spirit" and the wide-ranging freedoms of its students.

In 1871, James B. Angell, president of the University of Vermont, was appointed president of UM, a position that he held until 1909. Angell aggressively expanded the university's curriculum to include and expand professional studies in dentistry, architecture, engineering, government, and medicine. In 1880, President Rutherford B. Hayes appointed Angell a special minister to China to negotiate the immigration of Chinese laborers. Angell's publicity efforts abroad eventually prompted a large influx of foreign students to the university. UM also began to attract renowned faculty, including pragmatist philosopher John Dewey, who taught at the university from 1884 to 1894, and Thomas M. Cooley, who left the university when he was appointed the first chairman of the Interstate Commerce Commission by President Grover Cleveland.

Michigan in the 20th century 

University President Marion LeRoy Burton's tenure, which started in 1920, saw the advent of major field research initiatives in Africa, South America, the South Pacific, and the Middle East. Burton raised admissions standards and sought to heighten the academic rigors of the university's courses, while taming the often-rowdy social lives of his students. Burton later made the nominating speech at the Republican National Convention for incumbent president Calvin Coolidge in 1924. Shortly after attaining his place in the national spotlight, Burton died of a heart attack in February 1925. The memorial bell tower that bears his name remains a prominent campus landmark. Burton was succeeded by Clarence Cook Little, a highly divisive figure who, among other things, offended Roman Catholics with his vocal endorsements of contraception.

The 1930s saw a major crackdown on the consumption of alcohol and the rowdiness that had characterized student life practically from inception. In February 1931, local police raided five fraternities, finding liquor and arresting 79 students, including the captain of the football team and Michigan Daily editors. During the Great Depression, ritual and widespread freshman hazing all but ceased. Long known as a "dressy campus," student attire became less formal. Fraternities and sororities became less prominent in student life, as their finances and memberships went into steep decline.

UM's position as a prominent research university gained momentum in 1920 with a formal reorganization of the College of Engineering and the formation of an advisory committee of 100 industrialists to guide academic research initiatives. In addition, 1933 saw the completion of the new Law Quadrangle, a gift from alumnus William W. Cook. The quadrangle quickly became a campus landmark, known for its integration of residence and legal scholarship.

In 1943, Michigan was one of 131 colleges and universities nationally that took part in the V-12 Navy College Training Program which offered students a path to a Navy commission.

During World War II, the university grew into a true research powerhouse, undertaking major initiatives on behalf of the U.S. Navy and contributing to weapons development with breakthroughs including the VT fuze, depth bombs, the PT boat, and radar jammers. By 1950, university enrollment had reached 21,000, of whom 7,700 were veterans supported by the G.I. Bill. In the same year, the university purchased  of land north of the Huron River that would later become North Campus.

In 1948, Michigan's Institute for Social Research (ISR) was established by Rensis Likert. Harlan H. Hatcher, an administrator at Ohio State University and professor of English, was appointed university president in 1951. Hatcher fostered early construction in the school's nascent North Campus, and created an Honors College for 5% of entering freshmen. As the Cold War and the Space Race took shape, UM became a principal recipient of government research grants, and its researchers were on the vanguard of exploring peacetime uses for atomic power. During Hatcher's administration, the ISR, with its ambitious ongoing effort focused on research and applications of social science, received its own building. In a 1966 report by the American Council on Education, the university was rated first or second in the nation in graduate teaching of all 28 disciplines surveyed. In 1971, the central library on campus was named the Harlan Hatcher Graduate Library.

The beginning of Hatcher's presidency saw the university in the national spotlight over the first-ever "panty raid" in 1952, an event cheered on by hundreds of students and chronicled by the national press, including Life Magazine. Hatcher's legacy is marked, however, by a much more serious controversy: his suspension of three faculty members—Chandler Davis, Clement Markert, and Mark Nicholson—under pressure from Rep. Kit Clardy and his subcommittee of the House Committee on Un-American Activities. Davis ultimately was sentenced to prison for contempt, a conviction that he appealed to the U.S. Supreme Court.

During the 1960s, numerous UM faculty members served in the administrations of presidents Lyndon Johnson and John F. Kennedy. During their administrations, 15 alumni served in the Senate and House of Representatives. On October 14, 1960, Kennedy, who once referred to Harvard as "The Michigan of the East," announced his intention to form the Peace Corps in a speech on the steps of the Michigan Union, and by 1966 332 UM alumni were serving in the Corps. In a commencement address at Michigan Stadium on May 22, 1964, President Johnson first announced his intentions to pursue his Great Society reforms.

An enduring legacy of the 1960s was the sharp rise in campus activism. The campus tumult of the 1960s was to some extent foreshadowed during World War I, when disputes arose between faculty, administrators, and students over issues including military instruction and teaching of the German language. In the 1930s, student groups had formed to promote socialism, labor, isolationism, and pacifism, as well as interest in the Spanish Civil War. Political dissent, largely mollified by campus consensus during World War II, returned to UM with a vengeance during the Civil Rights Movement and the Vietnam War.

On November 5, 1962, Martin Luther King Jr. delivered two speeches to capacity crowds in Hill Auditorium and also participated in an intimate student discussion and faculty dinner reception at the Michigan Union. “The American dream is as yet unfulfilled,” he said, in his only known visit to Ann Arbor.

On March 24, 1964, a group of faculty held the nation's first "teach-in" to protest American policy in Southeast Asia. 2,500 students attended the event. A series of 1966 sit-ins by Voice, the campus political party of Students for a Democratic Society, prompted the administration to ban sit-ins, a move that, in turn, led 1,500 students to conduct a one-hour sit-in in the administration building. In September 1969, a 12,000-student march followed a Michigan football game; on October 15, 1969, 20,000 rallied against the war in Michigan Stadium. Radicals adopted increasingly confrontational tactics, including an episode in which members of the Jesse James Gang, an SDS offshoot, locked themselves in a room with an on-campus military recruiter and refused to release him. Hatcher's successor, Robben Wright Fleming—an experienced labor negotiator and former chancellor of the University of Wisconsin–Madison—is credited by university historian Howard Peckham with preventing the campus from experiencing the violent outbreaks seen at other American universities.

Low minority enrollment was also a cause of unrest. In March 1970, the Black Action Movement, an umbrella name for a coalition of student groups, sponsored a campus-wide strike to protest low minority enrollment and to build support for an African American Studies department. The strike included picket lines that prevented entrance to university buildings and was widely observed by students and faculty. Eight days after the strike began, the university granted many of BAM's demands.

Campus activism also changed the character of student social life. By 1973, only 4.7% of the student body participated in fraternities and sororities. The university's student government fell one vote short of approving a marijuana co-op that was based on the premise of high-quantity purchases and free distribution. Such attitudes persist in the Hash Bash, a rally and festival calling for the legalization of marijuana use held annually on and near campus.

During the 1970s, severe budget constraints hindered to some extent the university's physical development and academic standing. For the previous 50 years, all major academic surveys had listed Michigan as one of the nation's top five universities, a standing that began to diminish. For instance, the student-faculty ratio at the U-M Law School became the highest of any elite law school in the U.S. Though the undergraduate division is currently ranked in the top 25, the university is acknowledged to have a faculty whose teaching awards, publications, patents and citations generally rank in the top five in the U.S.

The university's financial condition improved under the leadership of President Harold Shapiro, a former economics professor, during the 1980s. The university again saw a surge in funds devoted to research in the social and physical sciences, although campus controversy arose over involvement in the anti-missile Strategic Defense Initiative and investments in South Africa. A new hospital complex was opened in 1986, including a new University Hospital and the A. Alfred Taubman Health Care Center that centralized outpatient care provided by the Medical School faculty. Also in 1986, UM launched M-CARE, a managed care health plan that provided HMO coverage and other plans to university faculty and staff, retirees, dependents, and to employers in the community.

President James Duderstadt, whose tenure ran from 1988 to 1995, was a nuclear engineer and former engineering dean who emphasized uses for computer and information technology. Duderstadt facilitated achievements in the campus's physical growth and fundraising efforts. His successor, Lee Bollinger, had a relatively brief tenure before departing to lead Columbia University. Two major construction initiatives in the late 1990s were (1) the University of Michigan School of Social Work building constructing a brand new dedicated building on the corner of South and East University. and (2) Tisch Hall addition to Angell Hall, named in honor of a $6M gift from mall developer Preston Robert Tisch.

Present day

In the early 2000s, the UM faced declining state funding as a percentage of its funding due to state budget shortfalls. At the same time, UM has attempted to maintain its high academic standing while keeping tuition costs affordable. The university administration also faced labor disputes with labor unions, notably with the Lecturers' Employees Organization (LEO) and the Graduate Employees Organization (GEO), the union representing graduate student employees.

In 2003, two lawsuits involving the school's affirmative action admissions policy reached the U.S. Supreme Court (Grutter v. Bollinger and Gratz v. Bollinger). President George W. Bush took the unusual step of publicly opposing the policy before the court issued a ruling, though the eventual ruling was mixed. In the first case, the court upheld the Law School admissions policy while in the second, it ruled against the university's undergraduate admissions policy.

The debate still continues, however, because in November 2006 Michigan voters passed proposal 2, banning most affirmative action in university admissions. Under that law race, gender, and national origin can no longer be considered in admissions.<ref name="NoAffirAct">University of Michigan Drops Affirmative Action for Now (11 January 2007). Associated Press.'.' Retrieved January 12, 2007.</ref> UM and other organizations were granted a stay from implementation of the passed proposal soon after that election, and this has allowed time for proponents of affirmative action to decide legal and constitutional options in response to the election results. The university has stated it plans to continue to challenge the ruling; in the meantime, the admissions office states that it will attempt to achieve a diverse student body by looking at other factors such as whether the student attended a disadvantaged school, and the level of education of the student's parents.

In late 2006, with the climate for health plans changing rapidly throughout the region and the U.S., the university made the decision to sell M-CARE to Blue Cross Blue Shield of Michigan and its Blue Care Network subsidiary. As part of the sale, a new health care quality organization called Michigan HealthQuarters was founded.

In 2021 music professor Bright Sheng stepped down from teaching an undergraduate musical composition class, where he says he had intended to show how Giuseppe Verdi adapted William Shakespeare's play Othello into his opera Otello'', after a controversy over his showing the  1965 British movie Othello, allegedly without giving students any warning that it contained blackface. The controversy took place against a background of sexual misconduct scandals at the university in recent years, both inside and outside the music department.

Campus history

The first two decades of the 20th century saw a construction boom on campus that included facilities to house the dental and pharmacy programs, a chemistry building, a building for the study of natural sciences, the Martha Cook Building and Helen Newberry residence halls, Hill Auditorium, and large hospital and library complexes. University President Burton continued the construction boom through the 1920s, including the construction of Michigan Stadium. In 1925, The University Hospital (also known as the Main Hospital) replaced the Catherine Street Hospital. Designed by Albert Kahn, the 893-bed hospital was the largest and most modern facility of its kind in the nation, and was used until 1986. Land for North Campus, which would house the College of Engineering, the School of Music, and the A. Alfred Taubman College of Architecture & Urban Planning was purchased in 1950.

During the 1980s and 1990s, the university devoted substantial resources to renovating its massive hospital complex and improving the academic facilities on the university's North Campus. At a time when many other universities were choosing to sell their hospitals and clinics, UM created a tighter bond between its Medical School and its Hospitals & Health Centers unit in 1997, forming the University of Michigan Health System to act as an "umbrella" over those entities and M-CARE, and designating an Executive Vice President for Medical Affairs who reports directly to the President. The result has been a financially strong and synergistic system for health care delivery, research and medical/bioscience education.

Nevertheless, in the past decade roughly $2.5 billion has been budgeted and expended toward such construction, with approximately another $4.8 billion in construction projects in 17 new buildings underway or in planning for the coming decade. Recently, the university has constructed over 1 million square feet (90,000 m²) of academic and laboratory space devoted to the life sciences. In 2005, the university unveiled a development master-plan for the medical campus that is expected to add 3 million square feet (270,000 m²) to the existing 5 million square feet (450,000 m²). Examples of new buildings include the Cardiovascular Center, the Biomedical Science Research Building, the Rachel Upjohn Building and the replacement for C.S. Mott Children's Hospital and Women's Hospital, scheduled to open in 2011.

The Ann Arbor campus is divided into four main areas: the North, Central, Medical, and South Campuses. The physical infrastructure includes more than 500 major buildings, with a combined area of more than 37.48 million square feet (860 acres or 3.48 km²). The campus also consists of leased space in buildings scattered throughout the city, many occupied by organizations affiliated with the University of Michigan Health System. An East Medical Campus has recently been developed on Plymouth Road, with several university-owned buildings for outpatient care, diagnostics, and outpatient surgery. The university also has an office building called Wolverine Tower in southern Ann Arbor near Briarwood Mall. Another major facility is the Matthaei Botanical Gardens, which is located on the eastern outskirts of Ann Arbor.

Notes

References

Further reading

External links
Official History of the University of Michigan website
Libraries & Archives Directory for University of Michigan
The University of Michigan - Bentley Historical Library
pictoral history of the library